The following is a list of WPI Engineers men's basketball head coaches. The Engineers have had 7 coaches in their 97-season history. The team is currently coached by Chris Bartley.

References

WPI

WPI Engineers basketball coaches